Theatre Under The Stars or TUTS may refer to:

 Theatre Under The Stars (Houston), musical theater company in Texas
 Theatre Under The Stars (Vancouver), musical theater company in British Columbia